Savaneta is a town and region in southeastern Aruba. Until 1797, it was the island's capital city. It is home to the island's oldest surviving home, a 150-year-old cas di torto, or mud hut. The Savaneta region has an estimated area of 27.76 square kilometers and 11,518 inhabitants according to the 2010 census.

History
Savaneta is the oldest village of Aruba. In the 16th century, it became the capital of the Spanish administration. After Aruba was conquered by the Netherlands, the governor lived in Commander's Bay, a natural harbour near Savaneta. In 1797, the government moved to Paardenbaai which would later become Oranjestad. By 1816, only one house had remained inhabited. In 1852, the Canashito plantation was established, and workers were exempt for taxation for eight years. Still only 13 men and 5 boys moved to Savaneta that year. Other plantations were more successful, and by 1867, Savaneta was recognised as a village. It was home to about 150 people. In 1877, a school was founded and in 1900 a church was built.

Notable people 
 Guillfred Besaril (1974), Minister Plenipotentiary
 Ibian Hodgson (1993), tennis player.
 Roger Peterson (1980), musician.

References

Bibliography
 

Populated places in Aruba
Military in the Caribbean
Military installations of the Netherlands
Government of Aruba
Regions of Aruba